"On the Radio" is a song by Swedish band The Concretes from their second album In Colour. It was released as the second single from that album in the United Kingdom on 12 June 2006.

Track listings
7" white vinyl single LFS7021
"On the Radio" (edit) - 3:15
"First Time" - 2:10

7" yellow vinyl single LFS7X021
"Off the Radio" ("On the Radio" edit)
"End of Mandolins" - 3:50

CD single LFS021
"On the Radio" (edit) - 3:15
"First Time" - 2:10
"End of Mandolins" - 3:50
"On the Radio" (video)

Charts

References

2006 singles
2006 songs
EMI Records singles